Šmarjeta is a village in the Municipality of Šmarješke Toplice in southeastern Slovenia. The area is part of the historical region of Lower Carniola. The municipality is now included in the Southeast Slovenia Statistical Region. The village includes the hamlet of Dolenja Vas, formerly an independent village.

The local parish church from which the settlement gets its name is dedicated to Saint Margaret and belongs to the Roman Catholic Diocese of Novo Mesto. It was built between 1910 and 1927 on the site of an earlier building.

References

External links

Šmarjeta at Geopedia

Populated places in the Municipality of Šmarješke Toplice